The Buffalo Bar was a music and arts venue located at 259 Upper Street, Highbury Corner, Islington, from 2000 until 2014.

History
The venue was situated beneath The Famous Cock Tavern, adjacent to Highbury & Islington station. The basement at 259 Upper Street had previously been a branch of Po Na Na nightclub, and before that, Club Down Under. The Buffalo Bar opened in 2000 and hosted performances by a large number of notable alternative and indie rock artists. 

As well as live concerts the venue hosted a number of club nights, including The Cave Club, Great Big Kiss, Afro Cuban Lounge, How Does It Feel to Be Loved?, Twee As Fuck, Artrocker, Guided Missile and Indieoke.

Notable artists that played the Buffalo bar include: The Libertines, Keane, Hot Chip, Bloc Party, The Kooks, Art Brut, the Pains of Being Pure at Heart, Friendly Fires, Two Door Cinema Club, Martha Wainwright, Stereolab, Futureheads, Bombay Bicycle Club, the Long Blondes, the Magic Numbers, Ed Harcourt, the Zutons, Oneida, Part Chimp, Electrelane, and the Joy Formidable, as well as others including the Horrors, Foals, Fiery Furnaces, Maxïmo Park, the Brian Jonestown Massacre, the Duke Spirit, We Are The Physics, Hope of the States, Animal Collective, Emmy the Great, Bis, the Maccabees, Jack Rose, Josh T. Pearson, Larrikin Love, Desperate Journalist, High Llamas, the Organ, Sleaford Mods, Thee Faction, Male Bonding, Colour Me Wednesday, Chris T-T, T.V. Smith, Spearmint, the Popguns, Shrag, Savages, the Tuts, Factory Floor, Fat White Family, These New Puritans, the Nightingales, the Wolfhounds, the Cravats, the Homosexuals, KaitO, Victorian English Gentlemens Club, Zombina and the Skeletones, Pink Grease, Tiny Masters of Today, Blood Arm, Frank Turner, Scout Niblett, Jon Langford, the Featherz, Poppy and the Jezebels, Yummy Fur, Country Teasers, the Lovely Eggs, Future of the Left, Blood Red Shoes, Joanne Joanne, the Art Goblins and Keith Top of the Pops & His Minor UK Indie Celebrity All-Star Backing Band. Promotional videos were also filmed at the venue including for Electric Eel Shock, Comet Gain and the Ethical Debating Society.

Closure
In November 2014, the Buffalo Bar announced that its lease had been terminated and the club would therefore be forced to close at New Year. A petition to save the venue garnered over 5500 signatures, the support of bands such as The National, The Subways and Mclusky (who performed a fundraising gig for staff), and the intervention of local politicians including local councillor Olly Parker and local M.P. Emily Thornberry. Parker said in a speech that the Buffalo Bar had "probably done more for cultural life in Islington than anyone" and Thornberry stated that the bar "makes a very important contribution to youth culture and.. the cultural significance of this part of London."

The Buffalo Bar was one of a number of grassroots London music venues subject to closure during the same period, including Madame JoJos, 12 Bar Club, Power Lunches, The Grosvenor, Passing Clouds and The Silver Bullet – prompting questions over the future of venues faced with the threat of "soaring rents..noise pollution orders, and developers". The Mayoral Music Venues Taskforce reported in 2015 that 35% of small venues had closed since 2007. In 2016 incoming Mayor of London Sadiq Khan appointed a "Night Czar", Amy Lamé, with a remit of looking at this issue.

References

External links
Article on Buffalo Bar, The Quietus
Article on Buffalo Bar Time Out

Music venues in London
Nightclubs in London
Defunct nightclubs in the United Kingdom
Underground punk scene in the United Kingdom